Katie Montgomery Dempsey (born September 11, 1952) is an American politician from Georgia. Dempsey is a Republican member of the Georgia House of Representatives for District 13.

References

Republican Party members of the Georgia House of Representatives
21st-century American politicians
Living people
21st-century American women politicians
Women state legislators in Georgia (U.S. state)
1952 births